Adele Neuhauser (born 17 January 1959 in Athens, Greece) is an Austrian actress. She began her career as a theater actress. Later she also worked for television and cinema. She is a member of the Akademie des Österreichischen Films.

Life 
Adele Neuhauser was born in Athens but moved at the age of four with her family from Greece to Vienna, where she grew up. Her mother left the family with Neuhauser's half-brother and Neuhauser and her brother stayed with their Greek father George. Later she grew up alone with him. At the age of ten she cut her wrist and until the age of twentyone she tried several times more to commit suicide.

After separating from her husband , Neuhauser moved to Vienna. Their son,  (*1987)  studied jazz guitar in Graz and in Weimar, before becoming a professional musician and composer of film music. She likes to hike, mostly on her own.

Neuhauser's grandparents from the Waldviertel were academic painters. Her brother, Peter Marquant, followed in their footsteps. The sgraffito on the Vienna Künstlerhaus were created by her grandfather. Because her grandfather was of the opinion that there should be only one painter in the family, her grandmother turned to the production of tapestry, Punch figures and worked for the Wiener Werkstätten. Her great-grandmother, although not subjected to persecution by the Nazis race laws, went voluntarily with her Jewish husband to the concentration camp where both died.

Career 
Neuhauser wanted to be an actress since she was six. 1976 - 1978 she trained as actor at the drama school Schauspielschule Krauss.
In her early twenties she moved to Germany and began to play at theaters in Münster, Essen, Regensburg, at the Staatstheater Mainz and occasionally also in Vienna.

Neuhauser gained nationwide attention for playing as woman Mephisto in Faust at the Stadttheater Regensburg. In addition, she also starred in movies (Helden in Tirol, Gone – eine tödliche Leidenschaft, Wo ist Fred?, 3faltig) and television series (Tatort, Polizeiruf 110 and Sinan Toprak ist der Unbestechliche) and became widely known for her distinctive voice, in particular through her role of the farmer's wife Julie Zirbner in the ORF production Vier Frauen und ein Todesfall.

In 2008 Neuhauser underwent a vocal cord surgery due to deposits and a Reinke's edema on the vocal cords. The pitch of her voice has thus increased a little and she has since then not been addressed anymore on the phone as "Mr. Neuhauser".

Since 2010 she plays the alcohol-dependent former vice squad investigator Bibi Fellner who suffers from Burnout syndrome and works on the side of Harald Krassnitzer (as Moritz Eisner) in the Viennese Tatort produced by the ORF.

Filmography (incomplete)

Theater (incomplete) 

 1986: Nachtasyl (Grillo-Theater in Essen)
 1990: King Ubu (Wiener Schauspielhaus)
 1991: Medea (Staatstheater Mainz)
 1992: Quartett (Theater Erlangen)
 1996-1998: Präsidentinnen (Theater Erlangen)
 1999: Maria Stuart (Theater Regensburg)
 1999: Faust (Theater Regensburg)
 2000: Macbeth (Theater Regensburg)
 2000: Meisterklasse (Theater Regensburg)
 2000: Macbeth (Theater Regensburg)
 2000: Medea (Theater Regensburg)
 2010/2011: Unschuldsvermutung (Rabenhof Theater, Vienna) as Karl-Heinz Grasser

Awards 
 1996: Darstellerpreis Bayerische Theatertage
 2012: Romy Film- und Fernsehpreis as Beliebteste Seriendarstellerin (most popular actor/actress in TV series)
 2013: Romy Film- und Fernsehpreis as Beliebteste Seriendarstellerin (most popular actor/actress in TV series)
 2014: Grimme-Preis for Tatort: Angezählt

External links

References 

1959 births
Austrian film actresses
Austrian voice actresses
Living people
Austrian television actresses
Austrian people of Greek descent